The verracos (literally 'boar'), in the Iberian Peninsula, are the Vettones's granite megalithic monuments, sculptures of animals as found in the west of the Iberian meseta – the high central plain of the Iberian peninsula – in the Spanish provinces of Ávila, Salamanca, Segovia, Zamora, Cáceres, Ourense and the Portuguese provinces of Beira Baixa, Beiras e Serra da Estrela, Douro and Terras de Trás-os-Montes. Over 400 verracos have been identified.

The Spanish word verraco normally refers to boars, and the sculptures are sometimes called verracos de piedra (pigs of stone) to distinguish them from live animals. The stone verracos appear to represent not only pigs but also other animals.  Some have been identified as bulls, and the village of El Oso, Ávila, named for "the Bear", has a verraco which supposedly represents a bear.
Their dates range from the mid-fourth to first centuries BC.
There are some similar zoomorphic monument markers in lands of Poland from the same period or older.

Though they were perhaps not confined to a single usage, the verracos were an essential part of the landscape of the Vettones, one of the  Pre-Roman peoples of the Iberian Peninsula. It has generally been assumed, from their high visibility in their original open fields surroundings, that these sculptures had some protective religious significance, whether guarding the security of livestock or as funerary monuments (some of them bear Latin funerary inscriptions). The verracos are particularly numerous too in the vicinity of the walled Celtiberian communities that Romans had called oppida.

Notable verracos

Portugal

 Murça
 Porca de Murça (literally the "Sow of Murça" in Portuguese, although the sculpture appears to represent a boar, i.e. a male rather than a female pig). The name has been taken to designate a red wine of the Douro district.
 Torre de Dona Chama
 Berroa
 Marvão
 Head of berrão, with right eye clearly visible, found in the Abegoa area of Marvão. Today in Municipal Museum in Marvão.

Spain

Castile and León

Province of Ávila 
 Aldea del Rey Niño
 Arévalo (one verraco in the Palacio del general Vicente de Río)
 Ávila (14 verracos from Tornadizos and three found next to Adaja River)
 Cardeñosa (Castro of Las Cogotas)
 Chamartín (five verracos, the best preserved is the Verraco of the Castro de la Mesa de Miranda)
 Martiherrero (four verracos)
 Mingorría
 Mirueña de los Infanzones (two verracos embedded in a wall of a house)
 Narrillos de San Leonardo, Ávila
 El Oso (verraco nicknamed "El oso" (the bear) and gives name to the town)
 San Miguel de Serrezuela (today in El Torreón de los Guzmanes in the city of Ávila)
 Santa María del Arroyo (Verraco of Santa María del Arroyo)
 Santo Domingo de las Posadas (one verraco)
 Solosancho (two verracos, Castro de Ulaca)
 El Tiemblo (four verracos, the known "Bulls of Guisando")
 Tornadizos de Ávila (eight verracos preserved)
 La Torre (two headless verracos in the atrium of the church and other embedded in a wall)
 Villanueva del Campillo (two verracos, one of them the largest in Europe)
 Villatoro (three verracos)
 Vicolozano, Ávila

Province of Salamanca 

 Ciudad Rodrigo (two verracos, one of them from Gallegos de Argañán)
 Gallegos de Argañán (one today in the Museum of Salamanca and other in the Casa de la Cultura in Ciudad Rodrigo)
 Juzbado
 Larrodrigo
 Ledesma
 Lumbrales (two verracos)
 Masueco (today in the Museum of Salamanca)
 Monleón
 Puente del Congosto
 La Redonda (today in the Museum of Salamanca)
 Salamanca (the verraco of the bridge cited in El Lazarillo de Tormes next to the Roman bridge and several verracos in the Museum)
 San Felices de los Gallegos
 Santibáñez de Béjar
 Tabera de Abajo
 Yecla de Yeltes (Castro de Yecla la Vieja, today in the Aula arqueológica)

Province of Segovia 
 Segovia (two verracos: a bull and a wild boar; today in the Museo Provincial).
 Coca (three verracos: two in front the City Gate of the Town and one embedded in the castle's walls).

Province of Zamora 

 Muelas del Pan
 San Vitero
 Toro
 Villardiegua de la Ribera

Castile-La Mancha

Province of Toledo 
 La Puebla de Montalbán. One verraco, found in 2006 and placed in the Museum "La Celestina".
 Castillo de Bayuela Two verracos. Located in the Plaza de San Antonio and in almost perfect condition.
Talavera de la Reina. Known as «cabeza del moro» ("the Moor's head") due to it being embedded in a wall, with only the head being visible.
 Talavera la Nueva
 Torralba de Oropesa
 Torrecilla de la Jara (two verracos)

Extremadura

Province of Cáceres 
 Botija (Castro de Villasviejas del Tamuja, "Tamusia")
 Guadalupe (Caserío de Mirabel)
 Jaraíz de la Vera
 Madrigalejo (currently in the Archaeological Museum of Cáceres)
 Segura de Toro
 Valdelacasa de Tajo
 Villar del Pedroso
 Pasarón de la Vera It was possibly destroyed in the 19th century, but still forming part of its coat of arms.

Further reading
J. Leite de Vasconcelos, Religiões da Lusitânia, Imprensa Nacional Casa da Moeda, Lisbon.
Eduardo Sánchez Moreno, 2000. Vetones: Historia y Arqueología de un pueblo prerromano (Madrid: Ediciones de la Universidad Autónoma)

References

External links
Jesús R. Álvarez-Sanchís, "Oppida and Celtic society in western Spain," in e-Celtoi: Journal of Interdisciplinary Celtic Studies vol 6 (The Celts in the Iberian Peninsula)
Photo gallery of verracos

Megalithic monuments
European archaeology
Lists of buildings and structures in Spain
Ancient history-related lists